"The Only Way" is a song recorded by British singer Lisa Stansfield. It was written by David Pickerill and Paul O'Donoughue, and produced by Pickerill. "The Only Way" was released as a single by the Devil Records/Polydor Records in the United Kingdom in November 1982. The single's B-side included another song recorded by Stansfield, "Only Love." Both songs were released on the In Session album in 1996.

Track listings
UK 7" single
"The Only Way" – 3:31
"Only Love" – 3:08

References

Lisa Stansfield songs
1982 singles
1982 songs
Polydor Records singles